Finegold Alexander Architects is an architecture firm based in Boston, Massachusetts, United States.

Finegold Alexander received the first AIA Honor Award for Extended Use for the 1976 conversion of Boston's Old City Hall to a private office and restaurant use. Other notable projects include Ellis Island National Monument and Museum (Associated Architects with Beyer Blinder Belle Architects).

References

External links 
 Finegold Alexander Architects website

 Architecture firms based in Massachusetts
 Companies based in Boston
 Design companies established in 1961
 1961 establishments in Massachusetts